The 1867 North German federal election may refer to:

 February 1867 North German federal election
 August 1867 North German federal election